Sophie Kate Wright (born 15 March 1999) is an English racing cyclist, who currently rides for UCI Women's WorldTeam . She rode in the women's road race event at the 2018 UCI Road World Championships.

References

External links

1999 births
Living people
English female cyclists
Sportspeople from Norwich